Conspica is a genus of moths of the family Erebidae erected by Michael Fibiger in 2010.

Species
Conspica inconspicua Fibiger, 2010
Conspica parainconspicua Fibiger, 2010

References

Micronoctuini
Noctuoidea genera